Sita Kumari Poudel is the former Governor of Gandaki Province. She was Appointed Governor, as per the Article 163 (2) of the Constitution of Nepal by the President Bidya Devi Bhandari on the recommendation of the Council of Ministers of the Government of Nepal on 3 May 2021. She was the prime minister's public relations advisor. She was also the chairperson of the All Nepal Women's Association, a women's organization of the CPN UML.

Personal life 
Sita Kumari Poudel was born on 	9 February 1958 in a Brahmin family as the Daughter of Krishna Prasad Poudel and Revati Poudel.She is unmarried.

See also
Karnali Province
 Governor (Nepal)

References

Communist Party of Nepal (Unified Marxist–Leninist) politicians
People from Chitwan District
Living people
Nepal Communist Party (NCP) politicians
Governors of Gandaki Province
1958 births